The municipality of Ensenada is the fourth-largest municipality in Mexico with a land area of  in 2020, about the same size as Hidalgo state and larger than five Mexican states.

Located offshore, Cedros Island and Guadalupe Island are part of the municipality, making Ensenada the westernmost municipality in Mexico and Latin America.

Incorporated on May 15, 1882 as the northern partido of the Baja California Territory, it became a municipality of the state of Baja California on December 29, 1953.

The municipality shares borders with every other municipality in the state: Tijuana, Playas de Rosarito and Tecate to the north, Mexicali and San Felipe to the east and southeast and San Quintín to the south. Its municipal seat is Ensenada, a port lying near the northwest corner of the municipality.

Ensenada's current municipal president is Armando Ayala Robles.

In February 2020, San Quintín separated from Ensenada and became Baja California's sixth municipality. Prior to this, Ensenada was the country's largest municipality. In January 2022, San Felipe separated from Ensenada and became Baja California's seventh municipality, further reducing the size of Ensenada Municipality.

Subdivisions

The Ensenada municipality is administratively subdivided into 15 boroughs:
Ensenada
La Misión
El Porvenir
Francisco Zarco (Guadalupe)
Real del Castillo
El Sauzal
Ensenada
San Antonio de las Minas
Maneadero 
Santo Tomás
Eréndira
San Vicente
Valle de la Trinidad
Punta Colonet
Isla de Cedros

Demographics

As of 2020, the municipality had a total population of 443,807 in 1,698 localities.

Ensenada, the seat, has 330,652 residents, and the following are the largest urban communities:
 Rodolfo Sánchez Taboada (Maneadero) (27,969)
 El Sauzal de Rodríguez (11,371)
 El Zorrillo (8,522)
 San Vicente (5,062)
 Valle de Guadalupe (4,334)
 Valle de la Trinidad (3,381)
 Punta Colonet (3,095)
 Ojos Negros (2,707)
 Poblado Héroes de Chapultepec (2,360).

Government

Municipal presidents

See also
Punta Colonet, Baja California
Maneadero

Notes

References
 Ensenada: Its background, founding, and early development http://www.sandiegohistory.org/journal/84winter/ensenada.htm
 Link to tables of population data from Census of 2005 INEGI: Instituto Nacional de Estadística, Geografía e Informática
 Los Municipios con Mayor y Menor Extensión Territorial Instituto Nacional para el Federalismo y el Desarrollo Municipal
 Subdivisions (delegaciones)

External links

 Ayuntamiento de Ensenada Official government website.
 Property frenzy in Baja California, Diane Lindquist, San Diego Union-Tribune, 24 April 2006.  Article on planned port construction at Punta Colonet.

 
Municipalities of Baja California